Ali the Fox is a cartoon character created by Xu Han (known as "Hans"), who graduated from the School of Fine Arts of Tsinghua University and received a master's degree. Ali is a red fox in white pants. The company controlling the character is Beijing Dream Castle Culture Co., Ltd.

There is a film, Ali．Dream Island.

Characters 

 Ali the Fox() - A male red fox 
 Peach() - A female pink fox who is Ali's girlfriend. She wears a white dress with a heart on it and a bow on the back. She also created by hans after ali was created.
 Bear() - A male brown bear
 Mika() - A white rabbit
 Shadow() - A blue lifeform

References

External links

Ali offic mwebsite 

Fictional anthropomorphic characters
Chinese animated television series
Anthropomorphic foxes
Emoticons
Animated characters introduced in 2006